A ledger line refers to the parallel lines incised or sculpted around the edge of the top surface of a mediaeval ledger stone (tombstone), laid flat on the floor of a church or on top of a chest tomb (or "altar-tomb"), within which lines is inscribed an epitaph or simple biographical memorial text, generally in gothic script and in Latin. The phrase "inscribed on a ledger line" is commonly found in the writings of English antiquaries.

Stock phrases or standard elements present in epitaphs within ledger lines on mediaeval church monuments in England include:
Hic jacet.. (here lies...)
... cuius animae propitietur deus amen (generally abbreviated to cuius aie ppitiet ds ame with tildes over the omitted letters) ("whose soul may God look upon with favour Amen")
Memoriae sacrum ... / MS ("Sacred to the memory (of) ...")

External links

References

Inscriptions